Moutoa is a rural community in the Horowhenua District and Manawatū-Whanganui region of New Zealand's North Island, on the Manawatu River. It is located Foxton and State Highway 1 in the west, and Shannon and State Highway 57 in the west.

The name is Māori for warrior (toa) island (mou).

The local Whakawehi Marae and Poutu meeting house is a meeting place for the Ngāti Raukawa hapū of Ngāti Whakatere.

References

Populated places in Manawatū-Whanganui
Horowhenua District